Souleymane Adama Diamouténé (born 30 January 1983) is a Malian former professional footballer who played as a defender.

Club career
Diamouténé was born in Sikasso. He spent his professional career in Italy, moving in the country after being noted by an Udinese scout. He then trained with the zebrette under-19 squad for a few months between 1999 and 2000, without being officially signed. After a friendly against Pisa, he was spotted by Francesco D'Arrigo, the head coach of the nerazzurri, who successfully signed him with his next club, Serie C1's Lucchese. Diamouténé spent two seasons with Lucchese, and in 2003 he was signed by Perugia.

In 2004, Diamouténé joined U.S. Lecce, becoming a mainstay of the salentini under coach Zdenek Zeman. He played two seasons in Serie A (2004–05, 2005–06) and two in Serie B (2006–07, 2007–08). He was confirmed with Lecce for the 2008–09 season, the first one back in the top flight for his club, but in January 2009, he was loaned to Roma with a pre-set price of €3.15M as a replacement for outgoing Christian Panucci.

On 31 August 2009, Diamouténé joined Bari on a loan deal.

On 10 February 2012, it was announced that Diamouténé had signed a one-and-a-half-year contract with Bulgarian A PFG club Levski Sofia. He was handed the number 25 shirt. On 23 May 2012, Diamouténé scored his first goal for Levski in a 7–0 win over PFC Svetkavitsa. In August 2016, he joined Maltese club Gżira United.

International career
At youth level, Diamouténé played at the 1999 FIFA U-17 World Championship.

He represented the Mali national team at the 2004 African Cup of Nations in Tunisia, the 2008 Africa Cup of Nations in Ghana and the 2010 Africa Cup of Nations in Angola.

Career statistics

Club

International
Score and result list Mali's goal tally first, score column indicates score after Diamouténé goal.

Honours
Perugia
Intertoto Cup: 2003

References

External links
 
 Profile at Football.it 
 
 Profile at LevskiSofia.info
 

1983 births
Living people
People from Sikasso
Association football defenders
Malian footballers
Malian expatriate footballers
Mali international footballers
2004 African Cup of Nations players
2008 Africa Cup of Nations players
2010 Africa Cup of Nations players
S.S.D. Lucchese 1905 players
A.C. Perugia Calcio players
U.S. Lecce players
A.S. Roma players
S.S.C. Bari players
S.S. Fidelis Andria 1928 players
Delfino Pescara 1936 players
PFC Levski Sofia players
Lupa Roma F.C. players
A.S.D. Igea Virtus Barcellona players
Gżira United F.C. players
Serie A players
Serie B players
Serie C players
Serie D players
First Professional Football League (Bulgaria) players
Maltese Premier League players
Malian expatriate sportspeople in Italy
Malian expatriate sportspeople in Bulgaria
Malian expatriate sportspeople in Malta
Expatriate footballers in Italy
Expatriate footballers in Bulgaria
Expatriate footballers in Malta
21st-century Malian people